Mahir Jasarević (born 14 January 1992, in Letenye) is a Hungarian striker who currently plays for Zalaegerszegi TE.

External links 
 HLSZ 
 MLSZ 

1992 births
Living people
Hungarian people of Bosnia and Herzegovina descent
Hungarian footballers
Association football midfielders
Zalaegerszegi TE players